Bidugade is a 1973 Indian Kannada language drama film directed by Y. R. Swamy and produced by T. P. Venugopal. It starred Rajkumar, Rajesh and Bharathi along with a host of supporting actors. Minugutare Kalpana made a special appearance in the film. M. Ranga Rao scored the music and the story was written and produced by Ramesh Movies. Chi. Udaya Shankar wrote the lyrics and dialogues. The cinematography by Annayya won him the Karnataka State Film Award for Best Cinematographer award.

The core plot of the movie is based on a short story which had earlier been an inspiration for two English movies - the 1946 movie The Man Who Dared and the 1956 movie Beyond a Reasonable Doubt. The 1983 Telugu movie Abhilasha , in spite of being based on the Telugu novel of same name, was reported to be similar to these movies.

Plot

The movie is about a reporter who concocts a false case so as to get himself convicted for first degree murder so that he can prove that the death sentence can be given based on circumstantial evidence and that it be done away with. However, by the time he is out of the prison proving his innocence, his father is falsely arrested in another murder case and is awarded a death penalty!

Cast

Soundtrack 
The music of the film was composed by M. Ranga Rao and the lyrics were written by Chi. Udaya Shankar.

Track list
6"ninna kanna kannadiyalli-P.B.srinivas

See also
 Kannada films of 1973
 Abhilasha
 The Man Who Dared
 Beyond a Reasonable Doubt

References

External links 
 

1973 films
1970s Kannada-language films
Indian drama films
1973 drama films
Films about capital punishment
Films scored by M. Ranga Rao
Films directed by Y. R. Swamy